The 2018 African Women's Handball Cup Winners' Cup was the 34th edition, organized by the African Handball Confederation, under the auspices of the International Handball Federation, the handball sport governing body. The tournament was held from April 13–22, 2018 in one venue: the Salle Omnisport Al Inbiâat, in Cairo, Egypt, contested by 9 teams and won by Petro Atlético of Angola.

Draw

Preliminary rounds

Times given below are in EET (UTC+2).

Group A

* Note:  Advance to quarter-finals

Group B

* Note:  Advance to quarter-finals

Knockout stage
Championship bracket

5-8th bracket

Final standings

See also 
2018 African Women's Handball Champions League

References

External links 
 Tournament profile at goalzz.com
 

African Women's Handball Cup Winner's Cup
2018 in African handball
2018 in Egyptian sport
International sports competitions hosted by Egypt
Sports competitions in Cairo
April 2018 sports events in Africa